James Andrew Wenger (born December 25, 1990) is an American former professional soccer player who played for eight seasons in Major League Soccer.

College and amateur career
Wenger made an immediate impact in his first year at Duke University.  He started in all 21 matches, and finished with four goals and three assists in a team-leading 1,896 minutes of action.  In 2010, Wenger started in all of Duke's matches at center back and was a semi-finalist for the Hermann Trophy.  In 2011, Wenger moved from center back to forward.  He led the ACC with 17 goals and 42 points and was ranked fourth in the nation in total points and sixth in total goals, earning him the Hermann Trophy.

In addition to being named Hermann Trophy winner for 2011, Wenger won ACC Freshman of the Year in 2009, ACC Defensive Player of the Year in 2010, and ACC Offensive Player of the Year in 2011.

Wenger also played in the USL Premier Development League for Reading United and the Carolina Dynamo.

Professional career

Montreal Impact
Wenger was selected No. 1 overall in the 2012 MLS SuperDraft by the Montreal Impact. He made his MLS and Impact debut on March 10, 2012, coming on a substitute in a 2–0 loss to the Vancouver Whitecaps. His first goal for the Impact came on April 7, 2012 in a Canadian Classique match against Toronto FC, the Impact's biggest rival.  With the score tied at 1, Wenger scored in the 81st minute to give the Impact their first ever win over their rivals.

In 2013, Wenger made 24 league appearances and helped the Impact reach the MLS Playoffs for the first time in club history. However Wenger and the Impact would lose 3–0 to the Houston Dynamo in the knockout round of the playoffs. Wenger made four appearances as the Impact won the 2013 Canadian Championship. Wenger made his CONCACAF Champions League debut on August 21, 2013 against Heredia and would score his first goal in the competition on September 24, 2013, also against Heredia.

Philadelphia Union
On April 4, 2014, the Philadelphia Union acquired from the Impact via trade in exchange for Jack McInerney. He made his Union debut and scored his first Union goal on April 12 in a 2–2 draw with Real Salt Lake. He made 5 appearances and scored 2 goals to help the Union reach the 2014 US Open Cup final. However they would fall to the Seattle Sounders in extra time.

In 2015, Wenger would help the Union return to the Open Cup final. This time they would take the match to penalties, but Wenger failed to convert his and the Union lost to Sporting Kansas City.

Houston Dynamo
On December 7, 2015, Wenger was traded to the Houston Dynamo along with his teammate Cristian Maidana in exchange for allocation money and the No. 6 selection in the 2016 MLS SuperDraft. He scored his first goal for the club in his debut, a 3–3 draw against the New England Revolution on March 6. On March 12 he helped the Dynamo record a 5–0 victory over FC Dallas in a Texas Derby by recording 2 assists and a goal. His performance saw him named to the MLS Team of the Week for week 2. He would finish the 2016 season with a career and team high 6 goals.

2017 saw the arrival of wingers Alberth Elis, Romell Quioto, and Vicente Sánchez  to Houston. The increased competition led Wenger to start half as many games as the previous year. However, Wenger was able to help the Dynamo qualify for the playoffs for the first time since 2013. The team would reach the Western Conference Finals, but Wenger would not feature in the playoffs.

Wenger got off to a great start in 2018, scoring 1 and assisting 1 in a 4–0 win over Atlanta United in the first game of the season. Due to injuries to right backs A.J. DeLaGarza and Kevin Garcia, Wenger was forced to play right back for much of the season. Wenger picked up an injury on June 9 that forced him to miss four games. He went on loan to the Dynamo's USL affiliate Rio Grande Valley FC to regain match fitness before returning to the Dynamo on July 25, a 3–1 loss to the Union. The Dynamo missed out on the playoffs, however they would win the 2018 US Open Cup, their first in club history. Wenger, playing at right back, would start in the Open Cup final and helped hold his former team scoreless as the Dynamo won 3–0 over the Union.

On November 30, 2018, Wenger announced his retirement from soccer.

Personal life
Wenger's younger brother Jonathan played college soccer at Elon and his younger sister Elizabeth played college soccer at Georgetown and was the 17th overall pick in the 2018 NWSL College Draft.

Career statistics
Source:

Honors

Club
Montreal Impact
 Canadian Championship: 2013

Houston Dynamo
 Lamar Hunt U.S. Open Cup: 2018

Individual
Dynamo Newcomer of the Year: 2016

Dynamo Humanitarian of the Year: 2016, 2017

References

External links
 
 Duke University bio

1990 births
Living people
All-American men's college soccer players
American expatriate soccer players
American soccer players
North Carolina Fusion U23 players
Duke Blue Devils men's soccer players
Expatriate soccer players in Canada
Hermann Trophy men's winners
Houston Dynamo FC players
Major League Soccer first-overall draft picks
Major League Soccer players
CF Montréal draft picks
CF Montréal players
People from Lititz, Pennsylvania
Philadelphia Union players
Reading United A.C. players
Rio Grande Valley FC Toros players
Soccer players from Pennsylvania
Sportspeople from Lancaster, Pennsylvania
United States men's under-20 international soccer players
USL Championship players
USL League Two players
Association football wingers
Association football forwards